Destination Fury is a 1961 Italian-French criminal comedy film directed by Giorgio Bianchi and starring Renato Rascel and Eddie Constantine.

Plot

Cast  
 
 Renato Rascel as Renato Micacci
 Eddie Constantine as Felice Esposito
 Dorian Gray as Pupina Micacci
 Fabienne Dali as Gianna
 Pierre Grasset as Jack 
 Raoul Delfosse as Pompon
 Mario Frera as Commissario Treta 
 Sylva Koscina
 Robert Dalban
 Magali Noël

References

External links

French crime comedy films
1960s crime comedy films
Films directed by Giorgio Bianchi
Italian crime comedy films
Films with screenplays by Luciano Vincenzoni
1961 comedy films
1961 films
1960s French films
1960s Italian films